The men's 4 × 400 metres relay event at the 2017 Summer Universiade was held on 27 and 28 August at the Taipei Municipal Stadium.

Medalists

*Athletes who competed in heats only

Results

Heats
Qualification: First 2 teams in each heat (Q) and the next 2 fastest (q) qualified for the final.

Final

References

Relay
2017